"U" is a song by South Korean pop group Super Junior, and is the group's follow-up release to their debut album Twins. The single topped CD sales charts during the first several weeks after its release on June 7, 2006. "U" peaked at #1 on the monthly MIAK K-pop album charts and sold 91,416 copies by 2008. The song won a total of five music recognitions, being Super Junior's most successful single in the music charts until the release of "Sorry, Sorry" in March 2009. Promotional performances for the title song, "U", did not complete until September 2006. The last general performance for the song was in August 2007 in Tokyo, Japan.

Since the Korean release of "U" in 2006, there has been two more releases of "U" in two different languages, Mandarin and Japanese. The Mandarin version of the single's title song "U" was released in a special Taiwan edition on June 15, 2007. On July 9, 2008, "U / Twins" was released in Japan, which included a Japanese version of "U" in the limited edition release.

Super Junior-M, Super Junior's Mandopop subgroup, also released a cover of "U" on April 8, 2008, marking it the second Mandarin version and third remake of "U". In this version, however, the lyrics were changed completely from the first Mandarin version. Also, new incorporations of a new jazz swing style with new acoustic guitar arrangements and an added hip-hop dance bridge and violin bridge were added to make the song suitable for the Chinese language while keeping close to the original Korean pop vibe.

History
Prior to "U", Super Junior was known for their member line-up, a concept very similar to Japanese girl group Morning Musume. Certain members of Super Junior's first generation were to be switched out and new members were to be added, which would form a second Super Junior generation. However, after the addition of a thirteenth member, Kyuhyun, the group ended their status as a project group and began to release productions as a group with permanent status. "U" is Kyuhyun's debut single.

"U" was made available for download on May 25, 2006 via Super Junior's official website. The second track from the single, "Endless Moment", became available for download four days later. "U" had over 400 thousand downloads within five hours of release and ultimately exceeded 1.7 million downloads, crashing the server.

Composed by Norwegian composer Ken Ingwersen and British musician Kevin Simm with the arrangement of Korean musician Hwang Sung-je, the song was promoted to be a song of "pure pop and dance" with contemporary R&B influences and harmonization. The rap lyrics of the song were written by Eunhyuk, in which the rap is divided to two solos, the first half for Eunhyuk and the second half for Kibum. Donghae also rapped in the background of Kibum's solo. The song lyrics was written by Tae Hoon, who also wrote the song lyrics for another Super Junior song, Dancing Out.

Several remixed versions of "U" were performed, but none of them were released as official singles. One remixed version of the song contains a dance bridge in the middle of the song right before the rap, and another version had the song completely mixed, creating a different pop vibe throughout the whole song.

Reception

"U" became one of Super Junior's biggest hits. "U" yielded number-one spots for five consecutive weeks on two of Korea's top music programs for the first time in the group's career. The song was crowned as SBS Popular Songs Mutizen Song of the week as soon as it was released, being the first award for the group since debut. The song then stayed as Mutizen Song for three weeks on the same program, also simultaneously grabbing two top awards from M.NET's M!Countdown for two weeks. Before promotions for "U" ended, "Dancing Out" was released on July 23, 2006 as part of SMTown's annual summer album, grabbing two awards as soon as it was released. "U" gained critical success, and Super Junior collected over seven awards in five of South Korea's top music award ceremonies as 2006 came to a close, winning Best New Group and popularity awards.

"U" peaked at #1 on the monthly MIAK K-pop album charts, having sold 83,010 copies by 2007, selling more than their debut album Twins by the first half of 2007. The Taiwanese edition of "U" debuted at #6 and peaked at #5 on the Five Music J-pop/K-pop Chart of Taiwan and charted in the top ten for six weeks.

Since the single's release, the song "U" had won Super Junior over five notable music awards. Super Junior won their first award since their debut after the release of "U" on June 25, 2006 as the SBS Popular Songs Mutizen Song, and stayed as Mutizen song for three consecutive weeks. The single also won Super Junior the Best New Group at the prestigious M.Net/KM Music Festival on November 25, 2006. The single has since earned more awards.

Music video

The music video for "U" contains only scenes of the Super Junior members performing their group dance. Yoona of fellow SM Entertainment group Girls' Generation provides the only female role in the music video.

The four-minute video mainly consists of the thirteen members performing their choreographed dance. Much popping, sliding, and waving were used in the performance, like many of Super Junior's other street dancing techniques. Chest movements and hip movements are heavily used and the pelvic thrust is also used in the dance, which became a famous action in future "U" parody dances.

The music video on SM Town's YouTube channel, originally uploaded on September 28, 2009, was remastered in high definition and in 4K on January 5, 2022.

Track listing
Korea "U" single

Taiwan U special edition (EP+DVD)

 "U" (就是你) [Mandarin version] — 3:45
 "Dancing Out" — 3:43
 "U" (就是你) [Korean version] — 3:45
 "Endless Moment" (無盡的時刻) — 3:38
 "Lovely Day" (美好的一天) — 3:02
 "U" [Instrumental] — 3:45
 "Endless Moment" (無盡的時刻) [Instrumental] — 3:45
 "Lovely Day" (美好的一天) [Instrumental] — 3:45

DVD
 "U" (就是妳) [Music video]
 "Dancing Out" [Music video]
 Making of "U - Music Video" [Traditional Chinese subtitles]

Korean Release

Chart positions

Sales

Japanese release"U / Twins" is a Japanese CD single released by Super Junior to commemorate their first Japan fan-meeting at Nippon Budokan in Tokyo and to celebrate the grand opening of their official Japanese website on April 1, 2008. It was released in Japan on July 9, 2008. The single peaked at #4 on Japan's Oricon Daily Chart on day of release, but dropped down four places in its second. The single was notable for being the first Korean single to be listed in the top 10 of Japan's Oricon Weekly Chart.

The single includes a Japanese version of "U", performed entirely in Japanese except the rap segment, which is performed in English. However, it was only included in the limited version of the single as a bonus track. The limited version was released for free to fans who attended the fanmeeting.

Track listing
 "U"
 "Twins"
 "Miracle"
 "Endless Moment"
 [Limited Bonus Track] "U" [Japanese version]

DVD
 "U" [Music video]
 Making of "U - Music Video" [Japanese subtitles]

Chart positions

Release history

Credits and personnel for "U"
Super Junior
Leeteuk – vocals and background (main, chorus)
Heechul – vocals and background (main, chorus)
Han Geng – vocals and background (main, chorus)
Yesung – vocals and background (main, chorus)
Kang-In – vocals and background (main, chorus)
Shindong – background vocals (chorus)
Sungmin – vocals and background (main, chorus)
Eunhyuk – rap lyrics, vocals and background (rap, chorus)
Donghae – vocals and background (main, rap, chorus)
Siwon – vocals and background (main, chorus)
Ryeowook – vocals and background (main, chorus)
Kibum – vocals and background (rap, chorus)
Kyuhyun – vocals and background (main, chorus)

Studio
Ken Ingwersen – composition
Kevin Simm – composition
Tae Hoon – song lyrics
Hwang Sung-je – arrangement
KAT – recording
Lee Seong-ho – mixing
Jeon Hoon  – mastering
Lee Soo-man – producer
SM Entertainment – executive producer
SM Studios – studio recording, mixing, mastering and editing

Super Junior-M's cover"U"''' is the first promotional single for Super Junior-M, the third official sub-unit of Super Junior. The song and music video were released online in China on April 8, 2008, on the day of Super Junior-M's debut. The song, including the rap, is completely performed in Mandarin, which differs from the previous Mandarin version done by Super Junior, where the rap segment is performed in Korean. Although the lyrics convey a similar meaning, the lyrics of the two Mandarin versions are different.

"U" is one of the twelve tracks featured in Super Junior-M's debut studio album, Me'', which was released in April 2008 in China and South Korea, and later throughout Asia in May 2008. Super Junior-M's modified version of "U" contains heavier bass instruments, a closer musical approach to hip hop and jazz. The song also has extra music bridges, such as a violin bridge performed by Henry (reminiscent of Super Junior's Don't Don) and an added dance bridge, which makes the song almost a minute longer than the original Korean release. Super Junior member Yesung appears in the song as a stock vocal as his parts are originally from the original Korean version of "U".

The dance choreography for Super Junior-M's "U" is also completely changed from the original. The choreography contains a variety of styles, such as different elements of street dancing and jazz dance to complement the maturity in the song, which slightly differs the image from the main group. The music video features the now f(x) member and leader Victoria, with her face dominating the mirrors, and the Super Junior-M members searching for her presence.

Musical personnel of Super Junior-M's "U"
Han Geng – vocals (main, chorus, background)
Siwon – vocals (main, background)
Donghae – vocals (main, rap, background)
Kyuhyun – vocals (main, chorus, background)
Henry – vocals (main, rap, chorus, background)
Ryeowook – vocals (main, chorus, background)
Zhou Mi – vocals (main, rap, background)
Yesung – stock background vocal
Yi Zhen – Chinese lyrics
Ken Ingwersen – composition
Kevin Simms – composition
Yoo Young-jin – background vocal, arrangement

Accolades

References

External links
SM Entertainment's Official Site
Super Junior's Official Site
Super Junior Official Avex Site 
Super Junior Japanese Official Site 
Super Junior-M's Official Site

2006 singles
Super Junior songs
SM Entertainment singles
Korean-language songs
Songs written by Kevin Simm